Killeen may refer to:

Places
Northern Ireland
 Killean, County Armagh, a village in County Armagh
 Killeen, County Down, a townland in County Down
 Killeen, County Tyrone, a townland in County Tyrone

Ireland
 Killeen, County Cork, a village in County Cork
 Killeen, County Laois, a village in County Laois
 Killeen, County Meath, a village in County Meath
 Killeen, County Tipperary, a townland in County Tipperary
 Killeen, County Westmeath, a townland in the civil parish of Castletownkindalen, barony of Moycashel

United States
 Killeen, Texas, a city in Bell County, Texas
 Killeen Air Force Station,  Killeen, Texas

Other uses
 Killeen (surname)
 Killeen Castle (disambiguation)

See also
 Cillín, a historical children's burial place